Roddy MacLennan (born 3 May 1989 in Livingston) is a Scottish footballer who plays for Linlithgow Rose in the East of Scotland League. He is a product of Clyde's youth system.

Career

MacLennan signed a YTS contract with Clyde in July 2007.

He made his senior debut in a Scottish Cup third round tie against Montrose in November 2007. His older brother Ruari also played in this match, and in doing so, they became the first set of brothers to play for Clyde for 17 years. On the day of this game, MacLennan signed a three-year professional contract.

He made his league debut a week later, in a 0–0 draw against Queen of the South.

His first senior goal came against Queen's Park in August 2008 in the Scottish League Cup. He also won the Man of the Match award in this game. MacLennan's contract was terminated in June 2009, following Clyde's relegation and financial troubles. He decided to quit football after this, and went to study Chemistry at Strathclyde University in Glasgow.

Despite earlier claiming to have quit the game, on 12 August, MacLennan played for Linlithgow Rose in their victory over West Calder United.

MacLennan was called up to the Scotland Junior international squad in October 2012 for their fixture against the Republic of Ireland.

Alongside his brother, MacLennan moved to Linlithgow's historic rivals Bo'ness United in July 2016. However, after only a year he returned home to Prestonfield with his brother and Strickland in the summer of 2017.

Statistics
Correct as of 16 January 2009

See also
Clyde F.C. season 2007-08 | 2008–09

References

External links

1989 births
Living people
Scottish footballers
Clyde F.C. players
Scottish Football League players
Scottish Junior Football Association players
Linlithgow Rose F.C. players
Bo'ness United F.C. players
Sportspeople from Livingston, West Lothian
Footballers from West Lothian
Association football midfielders
Scotland junior international footballers